Malek Tappeh (also Romanized as Malek Tappeh; also known as Malik Tappeh and Malik Tepe) is a village in Miyan Darband Rural District, in the Central District of Kermanshah County, Kermanshah Province, Iran.

Population
At the 2006 census, its population was 54, in 17 families.

Ancient Artifacts
A number of artifacts have been found in Malek Tappeh dating back to the 12,000 BC. These include bull-shaped jugs, ram-shaped jugs, and more.

References 

Populated places in Kermanshah County